Norman L. Jones (September 19, 1870 – November 15, 1940) was an American jurist and politician.

Born in Patterson, Illinois, Jones and his family moved to Carrollton, Illinois in 1872. Jones was educated at Valparaiso University and the United States Military Academy. He studied law with Henry Thomas Rainey, Speaker of the United States House of Representatives. Jones was admitted to the Illinois bar in 1896. Jones served as city attorney for Carrollton, Illinois and as state's attorney for Greene County, Illinois. In 1893 and 1895, Jones served in the Illinois House of Representatives and was a Democrat. In 1924, Jones was the Democratic nominee for Governor of Illinois. He served as Illinois Circuit Court judge and as Illinois Appellate Court judge. From 1931 until his death in 1940, Jones served on the Illinois Supreme Court.

Notes

1870 births
1940 deaths
People from Greene County, Illinois
Valparaiso University alumni
United States Military Academy alumni
Illinois state court judges
Judges of the Illinois Appellate Court
Justices of the Illinois Supreme Court
Democratic Party members of the Illinois House of Representatives
People from Carrollton, Illinois
Military personnel from Illinois